LOMO is a manufacturer of medical and motion-picture lenses and equipment based in St. Petersburg, Russia. The company was awarded three Order of Lenin decorations by the Soviet Union.

Its Lomo LC-A consumer camera was the inspiration for the lomography photographic movement.

History

The company was founded in 1914 in Petrograd (now Saint Petersburg). It was established as a French – Russian limited company to produce lenses and cameras. It manufactured gun sights during World War I. In 1919, it was nationalised. In 1921, the factory was named the Factory of State Optics, G.O.Z. In 1925, camera production was resumed, and several lens designs tested between 1925 and 1929. Further reorganisations of the Soviet optical factories in several stages finally resulted in that the factory at Leningrad became GOMZ, the Russian Optical and Mechanical Factory.

In the transition period 1932 to 1935 a copy of the Leica camera was developed, the VOOMP I. Today LOMO makes military optics, scientific research instruments, criminological microscopes, medical equipment, and a range of consumer products. 

Known as GOMZ (State Optical-Mechanical Plant), the company was transformed under the direction of Mikhail Panfilov, who united several industries and founded the LOMO Association in 1962. In 1990 - 1997 Ilya Klebanov was the Director General of LOMO Association.

The company went public in 1993, and was renamed LOMO PLC; it is traded on the RTS Classic Stock Market. The company is ISO 9001 certified and exports worldwide. Night-vision devices and telescopes account for 30% of the company's exports. Germany is the largest importer of LOMO products. Medical equipment, fiber optic cables and endoscopes, optical components and cameras are consumed mainly by the Russian market and other states of the former Soviet Union. Military equipment and science research instruments make a significant share of production for export to such countries as Israel, India, United States, Canada, Mexico, and other international markets.

Social standing
LOMO is regarded in St. Petersburg for its advanced medical centre.

References

External links

LOMO America, Inc.
USSRPhoto.com Wiki catalog of LOMO manufactured cameras. (See GOMZ/LOMO sections)

Manufacturing companies based in Saint Petersburg
Manufacturing companies of the Soviet Union
Electronics companies of Russia
Optics manufacturing companies
Photography companies of Russia
Medical technology companies of Russia
Photography in the Soviet Union
Manufacturing companies established in 1914
Russian brands
Soviet brands
Companies nationalised by the Soviet Union
1914 establishments in the Russian Empire
Ministry of the Defense Industry (Soviet Union)